William Koger House may refer to:

William Koger House (Smithsonia, Alabama), listed on the National Register of Historic Places in Lauderdale County, Alabama
William Koger House (Waxahachie, Texas), listed on the National Register of Historic Places in Ellis County, Texas